Hulua is a genus of South Pacific araneomorph spiders in the family Toxopidae, and was first described by Raymond Robert Forster & C. L. Wilton in 1973. Originally placed with the intertidal spiders, it was moved to the Toxopidae in 2017.

Species
 it contains four species, all found in New Zealand:
Hulua convoluta Forster & Wilton, 1973 (type) – New Zealand
Hulua manga Forster & Wilton, 1973 – New Zealand
Hulua minima Forster & Wilton, 1973 – New Zealand
Hulua pana Forster & Wilton, 1973 – New Zealand

References

Araneomorphae genera
Spiders of New Zealand
Taxa named by Raymond Robert Forster
Toxopidae